Gagarikha is a rural locality (a village) in Vozhbalskoye Rural Settlement, Totemsky  District, Vologda Oblast, Russia. The population was 1 as of 2002.

Geography 
Gagarikha is located 48 km northwest of Totma (the district's administrative centre) by road. Zalesye is the nearest rural locality.

References 

Rural localities in Tarnogsky District